Lisburn was a United Kingdom Parliament constituency, in Ireland, returning one MP. It was an original constituency represented in Parliament when the Union of Great Britain and Ireland took effect on 1 January 1801.

Boundaries
This constituency was the parliamentary borough of Lisburn in County Antrim.

Members of Parliament

Elections

Elections in the 1830s

Elections in the 1840s

Meynell was appointed a Groom in Waiting to Queen Victoria, requiring a by-election.

Elections in the 1850s
Seymour's death caused a by-election.

Tennent resigned by accepting the office of Steward of the Manor of Northstead, causing a by-election.

Smyth's death caused a by-election.

Elections in the 1860s
Richardson resigned, causing a by-election.

On petition, Barbour was unseated due to his and his agent's bribery and treating, causing a by-election.

Elections in the 1870s

Verner's resignation to contest a by-election in Armagh caused a by-election.

Elections in the 1880s

References

The Parliaments of England by Henry Stooks Smith (1st edition published in three volumes 1844–50), 2nd edition edited (in one volume) by F.W.S. Craig (Political Reference Publications 1973)

Who's Who of British Members of Parliament: Volume I 1832-1885, edited by M. Stenton (The Harvester Press 1976)

Westminster constituencies in County Antrim (historic)
Constituencies of the Parliament of the United Kingdom established in 1801
Constituencies of the Parliament of the United Kingdom disestablished in 1885
Politics of Lisburn